The scaly babbler (Turdoides squamulata) is a species of bird in the family Leiothrichidae.
It is found in Ethiopia, Kenya, and Somalia.
Its natural habitats are subtropical or tropical dry forest and subtropical or tropical dry shrubland.

References

Collar, N. J. & Robson, C. 2007. Family Timaliidae (Babblers)  pp. 70 – 291 in; del Hoyo, J., Elliott, A. & Christie, D.A. eds. Handbook of the Birds of the World, Vol. 12. Picathartes to Tits and Chickadees. Lynx Edicions, Barcelona.

scaly babbler
Birds of the Horn of Africa
scaly babbler
Taxonomy articles created by Polbot